David Andrew Rowson (born 14 September 1976) is a Scottish former footballer.

Career
He started his professional career at his hometown club Aberdeen. He returned from a loan spell at Livingston halfway through the 1999–2000 
 season where he was sent to recuperate from a knee injury. During the last ten games of the league campaign, he did enough to merit his place in the side to play Rangers in the 2000 Scottish Cup Final, ahead of fans favourite Hicham Zerouali.

In 2001, he earned a move to Stoke City. However, injuries blighted his time there, limiting him to only 18 appearances and consequently, he returned north of the border to join Partick Thistle. After playing there for a season, he announced his desire to move to an English club in the summer, sparking a host of clubs bidding for his signature, and he joined League Two side Northampton Town on a two-year contract.

He impressed in his time at Sixfields, and despite injuries in the 2005–06 season, he was an important figure in Northampton's push for promotion. However, after the final game of the season, then manager Colin Calderwood decided to not offer Rowson a new contract. He then joined Darlington and later had a spell at Boston United, before rejoining Partick Thistle in July 2007.

Rowson won most of the Player of the Year Awards at Partick Thistle at the conclusion of the 2007–08 season, when he played every minute of all but two league matches. He scored his first goal upon his return to the Jags against Livingston on 28 February 2009, with a 25-yard pile driver, having had several similar chances since his return fail narrowly. He left Partick on 30 January 2013 after agreeing to terminate his contract at Firhill Stadium. He ended his career with Stenhousemuir.

Career statistics
Source:''

References

External links

1976 births
Footballers from Aberdeen
Aberdeen F.C. players
Scottish footballers
Association football midfielders
Living people
Darlington F.C. players
Partick Thistle F.C. players
Northampton Town F.C. players
Stoke City F.C. players
Livingston F.C. players
Boston United F.C. players
English Football League players
Scottish Premier League players
Scottish Football League players
Scotland under-21 international footballers
Scottish Professional Football League players